Valtteri Jokinen is a Finnish judoka who competes in the men's 60 kg category. At the 2012 Summer Olympics, he was defeated in the third round.

References

External links
 
 
 
 

Finnish male judoka
Year of birth missing (living people)
Living people
Olympic judoka of Finland
Judoka at the 2012 Summer Olympics